StoneX Group Inc. (previously INTL FCStone) is a financial services organization. The company operates in six areas: commercial hedging, global payments, securities, physical commodities, foreign exchange and clearing and execution services (CES). The company ranked No. 58 in the 2021 Fortune 500 list of the largest United States corporations by total revenue. In July 2020, the company rebranded and changed its name to StoneX Group Inc.

History 
StoneX Group Inc. began as a door-to-door egg wholesaler that eventually grew into a butter and egg broker known as Saul Stone and Company. Saul Stone fled persecution in his homeland, Russia, and settled in Chicago in 1921. In 1924, Stone started selling farm wares. Eventually, he moved into hedging futures contracts and dealing in a variety of commodity contracts. In 1938, his firm became a member of the Chicago Mercantile Exchange. In 1946 it was incorporated as Saul Stone & Co. Decades later, Saul Stone & Co. merged with Farmer's Commodity Corporation.  After the merger, the new company called itself FCStone Group, Inc.

In 2007, StoneX went public. The company acquired Chicago-based Downes-O’Neil LLC that same year.  In 2008, StoneX acquired Globecot, Inc. and The Jernigan Group, LLC, a brokerage group that worked with global fiber and textile industries.  In 2009, International Assets Holding Corporation (IAHC) and FCStone Group merged to become INTL FCStone (now StoneX Group Inc.). Diego Veitia, who also helped found the Costa Rica Stock Exchange, founded IAHC. Veitia served as a chairman with StoneX.

The new company acquired Hanley Group Ltd in 2010, a provider of over-the-counter (OTC) products.  It was combined with StoneX's existing OTC trade business. Further expansion happened with a transaction to purchase the futures operation of Miami-based Hencorp Group, Hencorp Futures. Hencorp Futures changed its name to INTL Hencorp Futures and expanded StoneX's trading commodities to include coffee, sugar, and cocoa.

In 2010, the company partnered with Decisive Farming. INTL provided the organization with Know-Risk, a marketing tool that helps farmers customize crop marketing plans based on price triggers and time triggers.

The company reached an agreement with Hudson Capital Energy LLC (HCEnergy), a New York-based energy risk-management firm, in 2011. INTL's subsidiary, StoneX Group Inc. (previously FCStone LLC), took over HCEnergy's business and customers. This included HCEnergy's Swiss subsidiary, HCEnergy Europe GmbH.  The transaction expanded StoneX Group Inc.’s energy risk portfolio to include greater capability in crude oil and refined products.  In 2011, StoneX Group Inc. also saw the beginning of INTL’s CommodityNetwork. That year, INTL purchased on-line industry newsletter CoffeeNetwork from Hencorp Group.  A year later, the company announced plans to expand network coverage into the four major commodities: metals, agriculture, energy and softs. It already had cotton and dairy news sites, Globecot News Network and eDairy. The company won the Forex Magnates’s industry award for best liquidity provider.

In 2014, INTL’s subsidiary StoneX (previously INTL FCStone) acquired Sinclair and Company.  Sinclair, an introducing broker, focused on dairy, grains and livestock markets.  In 2015, INTL finalized a transaction to acquire G.X. Clarke & Co for about $27 million. G.X. was founded in 1979.  It was registered with the SEC as an institutional dealer in fixed-income securities.

In 2016, the company acquired Sterne Agee. The sale included Sterne Agee’s clearing business and RIA businesses.  INTL purchased the company from Stifel, just over a year after Stifel bought Sterne Agee as part of a $150 million acquisition.

In late January 2018, an agreement between INTL FCStone Financial, a subsidiary of StoneX Group Inc. (INTL FCStone at the time), and European platform Allfunds Bank went live. The agreement gave advisors using FCStone Financial access to thousands of UCITS funds without having to sign individual contracts with each strategies’ manager or distributor.  FCStone Financial was the first US-based clearing firm with access to the Allfunds platform.  Allfunds is the largest fund platform in Europe and offers access to more than 57,000 funds from over 1,200 fund managers.

StoneX first started working with London Metal Exchange (LME) in 2011, when it purchased MF Global Holding's metals unit. In August 2018, StoneX started developing an electronic trading platform for its LME clients, which would be similar to one created for INTL's precious metals clients called PMXecute. There is also PMXecute+, which connects consumers and suppliers of physical gold. In December 2018, StoneX announced that it would be acquiring GMP's US-based fixed income trading business which was formerly known as Miller Tabak Roberts Securities, LLC.

In 2019 StoneX Group Inc. acquired the futures and options brokerage and clearing business of UOB Bullion and Futures limited in Singapore. In April, 2019, StoneX launched a prime brokerage division. The new division offers clearing services for hedge funds, mutual funds, and family offices. In February 2020, StoneX announced the acquisition of U.S.-based brokerage GAIN Capital Holdings Inc., primarily known as the operator of retail brands FOREX.com globally and City Index in the UK. The all-cash deal, approved by boards of both companies, was worth about $236 million in equity value.

In July 2020, the company rebranded and changed its name to StoneX Group Inc. In October 2020, StoneX finalized it's acquisition of Frankfurt-based Giroxx which now operates as StoneX Financial GmbH from within the Global Payments division.

StoneX Group Inc. 
Founded in 1978, the firm was known as the Farmers Commodities Corporation until 2002. StoneX Group Inc. (previously FCStone Group) provided integrated risk management services such as market intelligence and analysis to help commodity traders in industries like agriculture, renewable fuels, energy, food service, carbon credits, and forest products. In 2007, the company went public raising $95 million. StoneX executed more than 100 million derivative contracts in 2008 and was a clearing member on all major US future exchanges. The Group served commercial commodity intermediaries, end-users, and producers around the world. 
As of Sept. 30th, 2009, StoneX Group Inc. operates as a subsidiary of International Assets Holding Corp.

International Assets Holding Corporation 
IAHC began as the International Assets Advisory Corporation in 1981. The company started in Winter Park, Florida in 1981 and was headed by Diego J. Veitia, a graduate of the Thunderbird School of Global Management. The firm's initial focus was the private placements of stocks and bonds of foreign companies. IAAC then turned its attention to high-net-worth clients, including individuals and financial institutions, and diversifying their investment portfolios through the sales of equity securities and global debt. In 1987, Veitia created a holding company called International Assets Holding Corporation and went public in 1994. IAHC transitioned into becoming a market maker of international equity securities in the early 2000s and is now a global financial services provider operating through wholly owned subsidiaries in the US, Dubai, Singapore, Argentina, the UK, Brazil, and Uruguay.

Merger 
StoneX Group Inc. (previously INTL FCStone) and the International Assets Holding Corporation merged in 2009 Sean O'Connor became CEO and Diego Veitia Chairman. StoneX operates as an independent business unit of IAHC, ceased trading stock on Sept. 30th, and brings over $229.3 million in operation revenues. IAAC officially became INTL FCStone in Feb. 2011 (now StoneX Group Inc.). StoneX Group Inc. serves more than 32,000 accounts, and more than 330,000 active retail accounts, in more than 180 countries through a network of 70 offices around the world. Within a month of the merger, IAHC expanded operations to the Pacific Rim with a new office in Sydney, Australia.

Subsidiaries 

 StoneX Ltd: formerly known as INTL FCStone (Europe) Limited, its name was changed in March 2013. It is based in the United Kingdom.
 StoneX Financial Inc.: formed in 2015 after the merger of three subsidiaries into INTL FCStone Securities Inc. The three subsidiaries were FCStone, LLC, INTL FCStone Partners LP, and FCC Investments, Inc.
 StoneX Markets, LLC

Services 

 Risk management advisory
 Broking in physical market; including wheat, barley, corn, sorghum (milo) and canola with in the supply chain of trucks, trains, ships and containers
 Execution of listed futures and options on futures contracts on commodity exchanges
 Structured over-the-counter (OTC) products in a range of commodities
 Trading and hedging of precious and base metals
 Trading of approximately 150 foreign currencies
 Market-making in international equities
 Fixed income, and debt origination and asset management

Leadership 

 Sean O’Connor – chief executive officer
 William Dunaway – Chief Financial Officer
 John Radziwill – Independent Chairman of the Board

References

Companies based in New York (state)
Agricultural organizations based in the United States
Risk management companies